Thomas Arthur Hall (20 April 1918 – 31 January 2002) was an Australian rules footballer who played for the Carlton Football Club and Fitzroy Football Club in the Victorian Football League (VFL).

Hall was runner up in the 1934 Tatong Thoona Football Association best and fairest award.

Notes

External links 

Arthur Hall's profile at Blueseum

1918 births
2002 deaths
Carlton Football Club players
Fitzroy Football Club players
Australian rules footballers from Victoria (Australia)